Akpınar is a village in the Başmakçı District, Afyonkarahisar Province, Turkey. Its population is 326 (2021). It lies on the south shore of Lake Acıgöl, near the border with the districts of Burdur and Denizli.

References

Villages in Başmakçı District